Clavister is a Swedish company specialized in network security software, listed on NASDAQ First North.

According to a report from 451 Research, the Edward Snowden NSA leaks and consequent loss of trust with US-based products has helped with the international expansion of Clavister.

Clavister has a global presence with customers such as the Japanese NTT-BP and the German Marbach Group. 

Clavister has partnerships with for example the Japanese Canon-ITS, and in the area of virtualized network security with Nokia Networks and Artesyn.

In August 2016, Clavister announced the acquisition of partner PhenixID, an identity and access management (IAM) provider.

See also 
Comparison of firewalls

References

External links
 Business data for Clavister: Reuters, Yahoo! Finance, Bloomberg
 Full version of the 451research report cited on the references above

Computer security companies
Computer security software companies
Companies established in 1997
Information technology companies of Sweden
Swedish brands
Deep packet inspection
Server appliance
Companies listed on Nasdaq Stockholm
Companies based in Västernorrland County